This is a list of visits made to the Philippines by heads of state and/or heads of government for diplomatic reasons, which is classified by the Philippine Department of Foreign Affairs as either a state visit, official visit, or working visit.

The scope of the list includes visits by:
heads of state and heads of government
The top leaders of international organizations whose membership compose of sovereign nations (e.g. United Nations, European Union)

Excluded are visits by (but not limited to):
Government ministers/secretaries, unless if the person makes the visit under the capacity stated above (e.g. Prime Ministers)
Government agency heads
Heads of sub-national jurisdictions (e.g. states, provinces, cities)
Members of royal families aside from the reigning monarch
Spouses of the head of states and governments

Sultan Hassanal Bolkiah of Brunei has the most visits (eight), followed by former President Sukarno of Indonesia with six. Representatives from Thailand have the most visits, with 25. Representatives from the United States, of which the Philippines is a major non-NATO ally, have the most visits outside of Asian countries. Ban Ki-moon has the most visits from a Secretary General of the United Nations, with two visits. Japanese Prime Minister Hideki Tojo's 1943 visit was the first state visit to the Philippines, while Sukarno's  in 1951 was the first visit since the Philippines was granted independence.

List of official dignitary visits

By leaders of sovereign nations

Presidency of Bongbong Marcos

Presidency of Rodrigo Duterte

Presidency of Benigno Aquino III

Presidency of Gloria Macapagal-Arroyo

Presidency of Joseph Estrada

Presidency of Fidel Ramos

Presidency of Corazon Aquino

Presidency of Ferdinand Marcos

Presidency of Diosdado Macapagal

Presidency of Carlos Garcia

Presidency of Ramon Magsaysay

Presidency of Elpidio Quirino

Philippine Executive Commission (Japanese Occupation)

By leaders of international organizations

European Union

Sovereign Military Order of Malta

United Nations
By the Secretary-General of the United Nations

Gallery

See also 
 List of diplomatic missions in the Philippines
 List of diplomatic missions of the Philippines
 List of international presidential trips made by Gloria Macapagal-Arroyo
 List of international presidential trips made by Benigno Aquino III
 List of international presidential trips made by Rodrigo Duterte
 List of international presidential trips made by Bongbong Marcos

References

Bibliography 
 Ho Khai Leong, Connecting and Distancing: Southeast Asia and China. (Institute of Southeast Asian Studies, 2009). 
 IBP USA Staff, Philippines Diplomatic Handbook. (International Business Publications USA, 2009). 
 Wilairat, Kawin. Singapore's Foreign Policy: The First Decade. (Institute of Southeast Asian Studies, 1975). 

Philippines
Philippines
Philippines
Philippines